2 Harihar Nagar is a 2009 Indian Malayalam-language comedy thriller film written and directed by Lal and produced by P. N. Venugopal starring Mukesh, Siddique, Jagadish and Ashokan. It is the sequel to In Harihar Nagar (1990). The film chronicles the story of four childhood friends Mahadevan (Mukesh), Govindan Kutty(Siddique), Appukuttan (Jagadish) and Thomas Kutty (Ashokan) who revisits their home residence Harihar Nagar after many years to relive their old days. However, problems arise when one of them goes missing. 

The film was a box office success. A sequel , In Ghost House Inn was released in 2010.

Plot
The movie starts with a flashback, in front of a church, in 1980 when the four main characters were children. This scene shows the beginning of their friendship. Thomas Philip (a.k.a. Thomas Kutty) loses money to a scam artist, who responds to his complaints with violence. He is rescued by the other three who respond to his calls of distress.

They then invite Thomas Kutty to join their group who, above all, vow never to cheat on one another. The scene is transitioned by the quote "Thomas Kutty Vittodaa!" (Thomas kutty, run!) once the scam artist brings his friends to return the beating he got.

The movie transitions to the current time: each of them are introduced again, 20 years later. Mahadevan is a Psychologist and an unhappily married father in the Middle East. Govindan Kutty is a Civil Engineer-CEO who's happily married Parvathi and settled in Kochi. Appukuttan (now Dr. Appukuttan Nair) is a dental specialist, living in Mumbai who often fights with his wife and twins.

The prologue show them preparing to travel back to Harihar Nagar to attend Thomas Kutty's wedding; he, after years of "enjoying" his bachelor life, has decided to settle down and marry an orphan who belonged to the same church as him. The prologue also highlights that none of them have really changed from their flirtatious ways, despite being married.

After arriving at Harihar Nagar, they settle into Govindan Kutty's old house at Harihar Nagar. Disappointed at how life has become sombre after growing up, they decide to revert to their younger selves for the rest of the trip. To jump start their "trip back to youthfulness", Mahadevan suggests that they should create problems in the neighbourhood: according to him, its only with problems that one becomes youthfully energetic. 
 
While staying at Govindan Kutty's house, they are greeted with flowers left at the doorstep with a tag reading "Maya". Immediately thinking that this is their old Maya, they go to meet her in a café. They barely miss her, but Appukuttan throws a rock and breaks her car's rear window. An anonymous woman steps out of the car, but it is not "their" Maya. They are immediately arrested. Later, "Maya" comes and gets them out of jail saying that they are her friends and didn't recognise it because she hadn't seen them in a long time. Once out, she says not to bother her any more because of this. Maya lives right across from Govindan Kutty's house. Trying to find the weakness that will draw her attention, one night Appukuttan looks to the window and is frightened by the sight of a ghostly figure with a "burned" face.

Thomas Kutty is not staying with the other three on that night, but he arrives the next morning. Mahadevan says a sentimental story to make Maya believe that they're not here for wrong reasons. She later comes and visits them and becomes their friend. A hilarious sequence follows.

It is revealed that Maya is John Honai's daughter, in cahoots with her evil brother (John was the villain in the first part). Thomas Kutty gets kidnapped days before his wedding and his three friends are suspected. They are followed by the police. Meanwhile, Freddy Honai, son of John Honai reveals that he has Thomas kutty. When the threesome (with great difficulty) enters Freddy Honai's hiding place they find Thomas Kutty. Freddy Honai demands the box filled with money which the old Maya had given them. The 3 friends say to Freddy that they will give the box when the original owner comes in front of them. Freddy calls them to a room where a face covered man with his wheelchair by halfly burned face is sitting. Appukkuttan remembers the face that he seen the face earlier at Christina's their known Maya's house. Freddy reveals it is the person the foursome knows as John Honai, his father. The box is now in a bank with each of the foursome knowing two digits of the password. The four escape, but now Appukuttan is missing. Maya is found and chided, but she tells her story full of dire circumstances. The correct code for the box sounds faulty. It seems that Appukuttan who is in the hands of Honai has forgotten his two digits.

After a lot of twists and turns they confround Honai who has a time bomb attached to his pet Lousie, a clinging lizard. The time bomb comically gets caught over each person. But then things get serious. The time bomb gets caught on Thomas kutty while Honai presses the ignition to burst in 30 seconds. Thomas Kutty runs to Honai in the last few seconds and pushes Honai and himself into the next room. The bomb explodes killing them both.

In the end, the other three friends eventually find out that Thomas Kutty is alive and was cheating them the whole time. Everything that happened thus far was a plan made by Thomas Kutty to get the money to pay a debt he had while gambling. They beats him up in pain and anger and leaves him at the same church where they started their friendship. He apologises for everything he did and they all reconcile at his wedding and becomes best friends again.

Cast 

 Mukesh as Mahadevan
 Siddique as Govindan Kutty
 Jagadish as Dr. Appukuttan Nair
 Ashokan as Thomas Philip a.k.a. Thomas Kutty
 Lakshmi Rai as Serina, (fake names) Maya, Christina Honai
 Sudipto Balav as Freddy Honai (voice over by Anoop Chandran)
 Rohini as Sulochana (Mahadevan's wife)
 Lena as Parvathi (Govindan Kutty's wife)
 Reena Basheer as Janaki (Appukuttan's wife)
 Rakhi as Jessy (Thomas Kutty's wife)
 Appa Haja as SI Cherian
 Janardhanan as Fr. Stephen Varghese
 Kochu Preman as Chandy, Thomaskutty's uncle
 Salim Kumar as Ayyappan
 Narayanankutty as Rajappan
 Chali Pala as Hotel Manager Vishwanathan Kurup
 Kunchan as Surendran
 Kalabhavan Rahman as Constable Ganeshan
 Vineeth as Shyam Sundar (guest appearance)
 Cherthala Lalitha as Mother Superior
 Geetha Vijayan as Maya (guest appearance)
 Kaviyoor Ponnamma as Andrew's mother (guest appearance)
 Rizabawa as John Honai (Photo Archieve)
 Rekha as Sister Josephine (guest appearance)
 Thrissur Elsy as Mahadevan's mother (guest appearance)
 Atlas Ramachandran as himself (guest appearance)
 Revathy Sivakumar as Mahadevan's Daughter
 George and Rafail Joseph as Appukuttan's twin sons

Release

Box office
The film was released in 130 screens all over Kerala and had a successful opening, owing to the cult following of its prequel. The film was highly successful which ran over 100 days in theatres, and was one of the highest grossing Malayalam film of the year. The satellite rights of the film was sold for an amount of 13 crore.

The film was commercial success. The film grossed 18 crore in 3 days in Kerala box office. It grossed  over ₹38 crore at the box office.

Critical reception
The film mostly opened to high positive reviews from the critics. 

Sify wrote "2 Harihar Nagar is just what intelligent filmmaking is all about and, no wonder, this delightful comedy is a winner from the word go". Rediff wrote: "The main reason 2 Harihar Nagar works is because the performance of the foursome that Lal is able to extract, giving us a sense of deja vu" and gave it 3 stars out of 5. Indiaglitz wrote: "To Harihar Nagar definitely offers rib tickling comedy and delightful watch from the word goes, with apt mixing up of inexhaustible laughter and few moods of seriousness at intervals".

References

External links
 
 2 Harihar Nagar

2009 films
2000s Malayalam-language films
Indian sequel films
Films shot in Kochi
In2
Films directed by Lal